Permission to Shine is the debut studio album of the Filipino band, 6cyclemind. It has 12 tracks and was released under BMG Records (Pilipinas) Inc. in 2003. The carrier single "Biglaan" reached #1 on the NU107 and RX 93.1 charts and the acoustic version charted in 97.1 LS. This was immediately followed by the single "Paba", which topped 99.5 RT, and "Nalilito". On 2004 the band released their 4th single "Sige". the song debuted at the NU107 Midnight Countdown at #4.

Track listing

Notes
The song "Biglaan" became a theme song of GMA Network's 2010 Primetime Drama: "Bantatay".

Personnel 
 Ney Dimaculangan - Lead Vocals
 Rye Sarmiento - Guitars
 Chuck Isidro - Lead Guitars
 Bob Cañamo - bass
 Gilbert Magat - drums & percussion

Additional Musician: 
Arnold Cabalaza - Keyboards on "Biglaan" and "Tunay"

Album Credits 
Executive Producer for Soupstar Entertainment Inc. : Chuck Isidro
Executive Producers for BMG Records Pilipinas: Rudy Y. Tee
A & R Direction: Vic Valenciano
Album Design and Photography: Herbert Hernandez
Marketing Executives: Ciso Chan and Mario Joson
Recorded At: TRACKS Studios by Angee Rozul
Album Mix: Angee Rozul
Keyboards on "Biglaan" and "Tunay" by: Arnold Cabalaza
Additional Lyrics on "Sentimental Garbage" by: Raimund Marasigan

Accolades

References 

6cyclemind albums
2003 debut albums